Steneurytion incisunguis is a species of centipede in the Geophilidae family. It is endemic to Australia, and was first described in 1911 by Austrian myriapodologist Carl Attems.

Description
The original description of this species was based on a specimen measuring 24 mm in length with 51 pairs of legs.

Distribution
The species occurs in south-west Western Australia.

Behaviour
The centipedes are solitary terrestrial predators that inhabit plant litter, soil and rotting wood.

References

 

 
incisunguis
Centipedes of Australia
Endemic fauna of Australia
Fauna of Western Australia
Animals described in 1911
Taxa named by Carl Attems